Tallusia is a genus of sheet weavers , that was first described by Pekka T. Lehtinen & Michael I. Saaristo in 1972.<ref name=Leht1972>{{cite journal| last1=Lehtinen| first1=P. T.| last2=Saaristo| first2=M. I.| year=1972| title=Tallusia gen. n. (Araneae, Linyphiidae)| journal=Annales Zoologici Fennici| pages=265–268| volume=9| author-link=Pekka_T._Lehtinen| author-link2=Michael_Saaristo}}</ref>

Species
, it contains five species, found in Asia:Tallusia bicristata Lehtinen & Saaristo, 1972 – TurkeyTallusia experta (O. Pickard-Cambridge, 1871) (type) – Europe, Caucasus, Russia to Kazakhstan, JapanTallusia forficala (Zhu & Tu, 1986) – ChinaTallusia pindos Thaler, 1997 – GreeceTallusia vindobonensis'' (Kulczyński, 1898) – Central, Eastern Europe

See also
 List of Linyphiidae species (Q–Z)

References

Araneomorphae genera
Linyphiidae
Palearctic spiders
Spiders of Asia
Taxa named by Pekka T. Lehtinen